Badiabad may refer to:
 Badiabad, Hamadan